Tisbury Great Island Bomb Area was a former naval bomb area for aviators, located in Great Pond, in Tisbury, Massachusetts.

See also
 List of military installations in Massachusetts

References

External links
Site map

Military facilities in Massachusetts
Buildings and structures in Dukes County, Massachusetts
Buildings and structures in Tisbury, Massachusetts
Tisbury, Massachusetts
Closed installations of the United States Navy